Anna Wala (21 March 1891 – 24 May 1944) was a Viennese fashion model.   Later she became a civil servant, working in a government mail censorship office.   She also became an anti-government activist.   She was arrested, convicted and sentenced.   On 24 May 1944 she was executed by guillotine at the Regional Criminal Court in Vienna.

Biography 
Anna Wala was born in Vienna.   After leaving school she worked till 1932 as a fashion model, demonstrating clothes for a succession of garment manufacturers.   She entered government service in 1940, working in a branch of the censorship office that specialised in foreign mail.

She was politically engaged from a young age.   She joined the Social Democratic Workers' Party (as it was known at that time) in 1915 and was also a member of the Gewerkschaft der Privatangestellten, a trades union for private sector workers.   After the 1932 General Election there was a transition to one-party government and the Social Democratic Workers' Party was crushed.   Further dramatic political change arrived in March 1938 when Austrian was invaded.   The invasion met with little resistance, and it led to the integration of Austria into an enlarged Nazi German state.   Sources are largely silent about Anna Wala's political involvement during the 1930s, but it is known that from 1939 she was involved as an activist with the Young Communists, which had been the focus of increasingly aggressive government repression since 1934.   Anna Wala made her apartment in Vienna 9 available for (by definition illegal) political meetings and for the storage of (illegal) literature.   She donated money to "Red Aid", a workers' welfare organisation widely seen – especially by political enemies – as a branch of the Communist Party.

In 1942 she joined an opposition group known as the Soldiers' Council Group.   The group engaged in the distribution of "illegal [political] literature" and a "Soldiers' Letters" mass-mailing operation, sending letters to soldiers on the frontline urging political opposition and desertion from the army.

Anna Wala was arrested on 25 May 1943.   She was charged at the special People's Court in Berlin with "Preparing high treason and supporting the enemy" ("Vorbereitung zum Hochverrat und Feindbegünstigung") on 23 September 1943.   Her co-accused were Alfred Rabofsky, Ernestine Diwisch Sophie Vitek, Ernestine Soucek and Friedrich Muzyka.   Anna Wala's charge sheet included the accusation that she had had close relationships with Jews ("... engere Beziehungen zu Juden").   On 8 February 1944 the court sentenced her to death and to lifelong dishonour ("Ehrverlust auf Lebensdauer").   Two of her co-accused were also sentenced to death.  Of the other two, Sophie Vitek's death sentence was subsequently reduced to a fifteen year jail term (thanks to a personal intervention by her brother with Heinrich Himmler) and Ernestine Soucek ended up with an eight year jail term.

Anna Wala, Ernestine Diwisch and Friedrich Muzyka were executed on 24 May 1944 at the Vienna Regional Criminal Court, where a guillotine had been installed back in 1934 in the aftermath of the so-called July Putsch.

References 

Models from Vienna
Austrian resistance members
People executed by Nazi Germany by guillotine
1891 births
1944 deaths